Maria Teresa Motta (born 19 April 1963) is an Italian former judoka. She competed in the women's heavyweight event at the 1992 Summer Olympics. Motta is a former athlete of the Gruppo Sportivo Fiamme Oro.

References

External links
 

1963 births
Living people
Italian female judoka
Olympic judoka of Italy
Judoka at the 1992 Summer Olympics
People from Sanremo
Judoka of Fiamme Oro
Sportspeople from the Province of Imperia
20th-century Italian women
21st-century Italian women